Darley Ramon Torres (born 15 December 1989 in Pedro Leopoldo), commonly known as Darley, is a Brazilian footballer. He currently plays as a goalkeeper for Mirassol.

Early life
Darley was born in Pedro Leopoldo, Minas Gerais, Brazil.

Club career

Atlético Mineiro (2007)
Darley started his professional career at Atlético Mineiro. At the age of 17, Darley made his debut on the highest level, playing a total of seven matches for the club from Belo Horizonte. On 13 December 2007, Darley had a successful trial period at the Dutch Eredivisie club Feyenoord. One month later, Feyenoord officially announced the arrival of the goalkeeper.

Feyenoord (2007–2012)
On 19 February 2008, Darley signed a four-and-a-half-year contract with Feyenoord. To slowly adapt to a new culture and lifestyle, Darley first joined the Feyenoord U19 squad for the seasons 2007–08 and 2008–09.

For the season 2009–10, Feyenoord decided not to renew first team goalkeeper Henk Timmer's contract. During pre-season, Darley had to battle with reserve goalkeeper Rob van Dijk and the returning Erwin Mulder, who came back from a season loan spell at Excelsior, for a regular place under the bar. After solid performances in the pre-season friendly wins against Sporting Clube de Portugal (1–2) and Sampdoria (3–0), Darley came out as winner. On 2 August 2009, Darley made his official Feyenoord debut in the Eredivisie home match against N.E.C. (2–0). Unfortunately, Darley had to be substituted during half time due to a knee injury, causing Darley to be sidelined for almost two months. Van Dijk replaced the youngster and has remained first team goalkeeper since. Darley's second appearance came on 8 November 2009 against AZ Alkmaar following Van Dijk's red card against Ajax Amsterdam the week before.

Following his persistent hip injury which restricted his first team appearances at Feyenoord, Darley was allowed to return to Brazil before his contract ended.

Statistics

Statistics accurate as of last match played on 8 November 2009.

Honours
Tombense
 Campeonato Brasileiro Série D: 2014

CSA
Campeonato Alagoano: 2021

References

External links

 Official Darley Ramon Torres profile on Feyenoord.nl 
 Kameraadjes Club: Darley Ramon Torres 
 Voetbal International: Darley Ramon Torres 
 

1989 births
Living people
Brazilian footballers
Association football goalkeepers
Clube Atlético Mineiro players
Feyenoord players
Clube Náutico Capibaribe players
Criciúma Esporte Clube players
Tombense Futebol Clube players
América Futebol Clube (MG) players
Boa Esporte Clube players
Botafogo Futebol Clube (SP) players
Centro Sportivo Alagoano players
Mirassol Futebol Clube players
Eredivisie players
Campeonato Brasileiro Série B players
Campeonato Brasileiro Série C players
Brazilian expatriate footballers
Expatriate footballers in the Netherlands
Brazilian expatriate sportspeople in the Netherlands
People from Pedro Leopoldo
Sportspeople from Minas Gerais